Perumal Peak or Perumal Malai Peak is a high peak at Kodaikanal in the Palani hills, that are a part of the greater Western Ghat mountain range in Tamil Nadu, India, having an elevation of . It is a favourite spot for trekkers. This peak divides the upper Palani hills to the west and the lower Palani hills to the east. The Kodaikanal forest department have their communications repeater atop the peak.

External links

 Kodaikanal - Perumal Peak

References 

Tourist attractions in Tamil Nadu
Kodaikanal